Südliche Weinstraße is a district (Kreis) in the south of Rhineland-Palatinate, Germany. Neighboring districts are (from west clockwise) Südwestpfalz, Bad Dürkheim, the district-free city Neustadt (Weinstraße), Rhein-Pfalz-Kreis, Germersheim, and the French département Bas-Rhin. The district-free city Landau is surrounded by the district.

History
On May 27, 1832 the Hambacher Fest took place in the castle of Hambach, an event which marks the beginning of the German democracy. The district was formed in 1969 by merging the districts Landau and Bergzabern. At first the name of the new district was Landau-Bad Bergzabern, it was renamed to Südliche Weinstraße in 1978.

Geography
The district is named after the first touristic route built in Germany in the 1930s, the German Wine Route (Deutsche Weinstraße). It starts in Bockenheim an der Weinstraße, goes through Bad Dürkheim, Deidesheim, and after 85 kilometers ends in Schweigen-Rechtenbach (near Bad Bergzabern).

The river Lauter forms part of the boundary with France in the south.

Coat of arms
The coat of arms is very similar to the one of the previous district Landau. In the top-left is the lion of the Electorate of the Palatinate. The white bar in the middle symbolizes the Weinstraße, the touristic route which gave the district its name. The bottom-right show two bunches of grapes, again symbolizing the route. The cross stands for Speyer, as the diocese of Speyer owned land in the district historically. The crown in the middle is taken from the coat of arms of the Bad Bergzabern district, symbolizing the Trifels and Annweiler areas.

Towns and municipalities

See also 
 Südliche Weinstraße Wildlife Park

References

External links

 

 
Districts of Rhineland-Palatinate
South Palatinate
Anterior Palatinate